Elmira Heights Central School District is a school district in Elmira Heights, New York.

Schools
Cohen Elementary School
Cohen Middle School
Thomas Edison High School

Nail Files television star Katie Cazorla attended elementary school in Elmira Heights, although she graduated from nearby Horseheads High School. Top-ranked national quizzer Scott Blish, the 2015 national LearnedLeague Champion, graduated from Thomas Edison High School in 1990.

Athletics
Baseball
Basketball
Bowling
Cheerleading
Cross Country
Football
Golf
Softball
Tennis
Track and Field
Volleyball
Wrestling

See also
List of school districts in New York

References

Education in Chemung County, New York
School districts in New York (state)
Elmira Heights, New York
School districts established in 1953